Magdalena Bogdziewicz (born 17 November 1975) is a Polish civil servant who serves as an ambassador to Singapore since July 2018.

Magdalena Bogdziewicz has graduated from Dutch studies at the University of Wrocław in 1999. That year she started diplomatic training at the Ministry of Foreign Affairs. She has been working on East Asia issues, congressional affairs and EU issues at the Embassy in Washington (2004–2008) and in Bucharest (2010–2015). In 2015, she became deputy director, and in 2017, she was promoted to the director of the Office of the Director General at the MFA headquarters.

In July 2018, she was appointed as Poland ambassador to Singapore. She presented her credentials to the President of Singapore Halimah Yacob on 24 August 2018.

Besides Polish, she can speak English, German, Dutch and, to some extent, Romanian and French languages. She is married to Paweł Bogdziewicz. They have three children.

References 

1975 births
Ambassadors of Poland to Singapore
Living people
University of Wrocław alumni
Polish women ambassadors